John Albert Cloud (born 1953) is a professor in the National Security Affairs Department of  the U.S. Naval War College and former ambassador for the United States of America to the Republic of Lithuania. Cloud also holds the William B. Ruger Chair of National Security Economics while specializing in European and economic issues.

Education
He has completed bachelor studies in University of Connecticut in 1975, and a Masters in International Affairs in George Washington University in 1977. 
From February 28, 2005, to September 2, 2005, he was a US ambassador to Germany ad interim. 
From July 18, 2006, to July 7, 2009, he served as ambassador.

Career
Cloud served as U.S. Ambassador to the Republic of Lithuania from August 2006 to July 2009 and he previously served as the Deputy Chief of Mission at the United States Embassy located in Berlin, Germany.

Cloud was also a special assistant to the President and Senior Director for International Economic Affairs on the National Security Council staff from 2001 - 2003. Cloud later became Deputy Chief of Mission at the U.S. Mission to the European Union from 1999 to 2001. During this period of time from 1996 to 1999, Cloud served as the Deputy Chief of Mission at the American Embassy in Warsaw, Poland.

From 1991 to 1995, Cloud was the Economic Counselor at the American Embassy in Bonn, Germany. He served at the State Department from 1988 to 1991. He serves as a professor in the National Security Affairs Department at the Naval War College in Newport, Rhode Island, where he holds the William B. Ruger Chair of National Security Economics.

Family
He has a wife Mary Elizabeth and 2 children.

References 

1953 births
Living people
Ambassadors of the United States to Lithuania
Ambassadors of the United States to Germany
Elliott School of International Affairs alumni
Naval War College faculty
University of Connecticut alumni